Throughout his career, Dutch electronic DJ and producer Tiësto has released seven studio albums. After spending years searching for his personal style and working with DJs like Ferry Corsten (as Gouryella), Benno de Goeij (as Kamaya Painters) and Armin van Buuren (as Alibi and Major League), he decided it was time to focus on his solo work. Tiësto's fame started to rise in the late 1990s after his set at the first ID&T Innercity party (Live at Innercity: Amsterdam RAI), and it continued to skyrocket in the early 2000s following his six-hour "Tiësto Solo" sets, which he performed without any other DJs or opening acts. His last three full-length releases broke the 70,000-unit mark, and the 2003 DJ mix Nyana hit 87,000, according to Nielsen SoundScan in mid-2008.

In 1994, Tiësto began releasing material on Noculan Records' sub-labels Chemo and Coolman. Later that year he signed to Basic Beat Recordings, where he met Arny Bink. Tiësto released records on the sub-label Trashcan, founded by Bink, and created the sub-label Guardian Angel with Bink, where they introduced the popular Forbidden Paradise series. From 1995 to 1996 Tiësto released four extended plays on Bonzai Jumps and XTC, sub-labels of Lightning Records. In 1997, Tiësto joined his friend Yves Vandichel on his sub-label, DJ Yves, a division of the now defunct Human Resource label XSV Music. In the fall of 1997, both Bink and Tiësto decided to leave Basic Beat and create their own parent label, now known as Black Hole Recordings. Trashcan was discontinued and Guardian Angel continued releasing music until 2002. In 1998, Tiësto released the Magik series through Black Hole and created two major sub-labels, In Trance We Trust and SongBird. From 1998 to 1999, Tiësto released music on Planetary Consciousness. There he met A&R Hardy Heller and invited him to release records on Black Hole. Tiësto later included the In Search of Sunrise series on SongBird and opened a new division of Black Hole, Magik Muzik, in 2001, which is now the home of the major chart-topping songs by Tiësto. The sub-label released exclusive material but has expanded since then.

Tiësto's first studio album, In My Memory, produced four major hits: "Flight 643", "Obsession", "Lethal Industry", and "Suburban Train". After becoming the "No. 1 DJ in the world" according to DJMag for three consecutive years, he released his second studio album in 2004, Just Be. The album contained one number one hit, "Traffic", which was the first instrumental track to reach the top spot in his homeland the Netherlands in 23 years. The album also contained a new trance anthem, "Adagio for Strings", a remake of Samuel Barber's classical song "Adagio for Strings". Tiësto became the first DJ to perform live at the Olympic Games when he was asked to perform during the 2004 Summer Olympics Opening Ceremony. The set that he performed there was later condensed and released on CD as Parade of the Athletes. In 2007, Tiësto released his third studio album, Elements of Life, which moved 72,000 units in its April release according to Nielsen SoundScan. On October 6, 2009, Tiësto released his fourth studio album, Kaleidoscope. Unlike his earlier albums, which were all mostly trance, Kaleidoscope explores other electronic genres, and is considered Tiesto's most experimental album. On June 16, 2014, Tiësto released his fifth studio album, A Town Called Paradise. In 2020, he released his sixth studio album, The London Sessions, which was a collaborative album with multiple producers including Shaun Frank and Jonas Blue.

Albums

Studio albums

Compilation albums

Remix albums

Extended plays

Video albums

DJ mixes
This list contains DJ mixes produced by Tiësto.

Singles

As lead artist

As featured artist

Promotional singles

Remixes

Notes

References

External links
 
 

Discography
Discographies of Dutch artists
Electronic music discographies